Zeridoneus is a genus of dirt-colored seed bugs in the family Rhyparochromidae. There are at least three described species in Zeridoneus.

Species
These three species belong to the genus Zeridoneus:
 Zeridoneus costalis (Van Duzee, 1909)
 Zeridoneus knulli Barber, 1948
 Zeridoneus petersoni Reichart, 1966

References

Rhyparochromidae
Articles created by Qbugbot
Pentatomomorpha genera